Uddessho Nei is the sixth solo album by Bangladeshi singer Tahsan. It was released on 22 July 2014 through G-Series.

Track listing

References 

2014 albums
Tahsan Rahman Khan albums